Brian Hayes (born 10 December 1949) is an American scientist, columnist and author.

He is a senior writer and regular columnist for the magazine American Scientist, and was editor in chief for the magazine from 1990 to 1992. He has also edited and written columns for Scientific American, as well as writing for Computer Language and The Sciences. He won a National Magazine Award for his essay "Clock of Ages" in 2000.

He is the author of three books:
Infrastructure: A Field Guide to the Industrial Landscape (W. W. Norton, 2005, ; revised and updated edition: W.W. Norton, 2014).
Group Theory in the Bedroom, and Other Mathematical Diversions (Hill and Wang, 2008; Macmillan, 2009).
Foolproof, and Other Mathematical Meditations (MIT Press, 2017,

References

External links

bit-player, Hayes' blog
Hayes' author page at The American Scientist, with links to his columns and book reviews

American columnists
American non-fiction writers
Living people
Science bloggers
1949 births